Sergio Allievi (born 17 January 1964) is a retired German football player.

References

External links
 

1964 births
Living people
German footballers
SG Wattenscheid 09 players
1. FC Kaiserslautern players
Dynamo Dresden players
SpVgg Unterhaching players
Fortuna Düsseldorf players
Bundesliga players
2. Bundesliga players
DDR-Oberliga players
Association football midfielders
Footballers from Essen
20th-century German people